Margaret Beckett led the United Kingdom Shadow Cabinet when she was Leader of the Labour Party on a pro tempore Leader of the Opposition basis between the death of John Smith on 12 May 1994 and Tony Blair's election as Leader on 21 July 1994, an election in which Beckett was also a candidate. Her Shadow Cabinet was identical to Smith's final one with the exception of her role and the appointment of Nick Brown as Acting Shadow Leader of the House of Commons.

Shadow Cabinet

See also
 1994 Labour Party leadership election

Beckett
Official Opposition (United Kingdom)
1994 establishments in the United Kingdom
1994 disestablishments in the United Kingdom
British shadow cabinets
1994 in British politics